Hernán Neira (Lima, Perú, 1960) is a Chilean writer, philosopher and university professor.

Education 
He attended in Chile to Colegio San Ignacio in Santiago de Chile. His family moved to Spain in 1971, where he attended to Colegio San Patricio and Instituto Cardenal Cisneros. In January 1984 he received his undergraduate degree in philosophy from the Catholic University in Santiago de Chile, where he also directed Perspectivas, a student magazine opposed to the dictatorship of general Pinochet. In 1985 he moved to Paris, where he studied philosophy at the Paris VIII University. He also studied sociology and linguistics at the l'École de hautes etudes en sciences sociales, Paris. In 1992 returned to Chile.

Career 
His first post was in Universidad de La Serena (1984-1985), Chile. In Paris he taught at the Institut d'études politiques, Paris (1991-1992), and again in Chile in Universidad Austral (1993-2007). He has invited to teach at the University of Chile, Diego Portales, Los Lagos, La Frontera and Universidad Nacional Andrés Bello. Hernán Neira has also given several conferences in Europe. Since 2008 he is professor of political philosophy at Universidad de Santiago de Chile. In 2011 he was elected to the Academic Counsel of this university.

He has become one of the outstanding Chilean literary voices, gradually becoming a cult writer. In 2005, Mathieu Lindon wrote about him in the French paper Libération: “There is, dans Les naufragés (French translation of El naufragio de la luz), not properly an atmosphere and tone, but a strategy of rising malaise, which reminds both Julian Grack and Marie NDiaye”, and the Swiss paper “La Tribune  de Genève” compared him with Joseph Conrad. In 2004 Hernán Neirawas interviewed by the Chilean paper El Mostrador, considered himself as “outsider”.  His first short-stories book, A golpes de hacha y fuego (By blows of axe and fire, Editorial Andrés Bello Santiago, 1995) was unanimously welcome.

As a philosopher, his main research areas are political philosophy, animal ethics and literary aesthetics.

He has published scientific articles in Chile, the United States, Spain, the Netherlands and Cuba, and has received six times the support of the National Found for Science and Technology (Fondecyt). He is currently leading a research on political aspects of philosophical and political suicide.

He published two novels, El sueño inconcluso (The unended dream) (Editorial Planeta, Santiago, 1999) and El naufragio de la luz (The shipwreck of the light) (Ediciones B, Barcelona, 2004). He has also published compilations of essays in El espejo del olvido  (The mirror of forgetfulness) (Dolmen Ediciones, Santiago, 1997), and La ciudad y las palabras (The city and words) (Editorial Universitaria, Santiago, 2004). In addition, he has collaborated with the newspapers El Mercurio (Chile) and El País (Spain), and with the magazines Ecos de España y Latinoamérica (Germany), and The International Literary Quarterly, New York.

In 2003, the novel El naufragio de la luz (The shipwreck of the light) won unanimously the Dos Orillas award, given by four European publishing houses, that have translated his novel into French, Portuguese and Greek.

His narrative Almuerzos de verano (Summer Lunches) received the award of the Fondo Nacional del Libro y de la Lectura (2018) and has been recently published by the International Literary Quarterly.

Work

Novels 
El sueño inconcluso (Editorial Planeta, Santiago de Chile 1999)
El naufragio de la luz (Ediciones B, Barcelona 2004)

Short stories books 
 A golpes de hacha y fuego, cuentos, Editorial Andrés Bello, 1995. . 
 Los viajes del argonauta. Ediciones Mar del Plata. Santiago de Chile, 1985.

Other stories
Un hombre en casa. Extract from Almuerzos de verano. In "The International Literary Quarterly", 2020.

Theater

Philosophical books
El espejo del olvido.  Dolmen Ediciones, Santiago 1997.
La ciudad y las palabras. Editorial Universitaria. Santiago de Chile 2004.
Visión de los vencidos. La idea de América en las Memorias de Juan Bautista Tupac Amaru. Editorial Universidad de Santiago de Chile, Santiago 2009.
Leituras contemporâneas da modernidade. Editora Universidade Federal do Paraná, Curitiba (Brasil) 2013.
O individuo inquietante. Sob o signo de Lope de Aguirre. Editora Universidade Federal do Paraná, Curitiba (Brasil) 2013. 
Olhares de América. Editora Universidade Federal do Paraná, Curitiba (Brasil) 2013.

Philosophical articles 
 Ecological Climax as Policy Goal for Environmental Restoration: The Case of Parque Pumalín and Intentional Management for Ecosystem and Human Health. ENVIRONMENTAL ETHICS. 2020. En prensa.
 
 
 
 
 
 
 
 Epistemología de los animales. Capítulo en el libro electrónico Es tiempo de coexistir. Perspectivas, debates y otras provocaciones en torno a los animales no humanos. Editorial Latinoamericana de Estudios Críticos Animales. La Plata, Argentina. 2017, pp. 194–204. .
 
 Clasificación, comunidad y soberanía: más allá de la fundamentación individualista de los derechos de los animales. Revista FILOSOFIA UNISINOS. Vol 17, N.2, 2016, pp. 271–282. WoS/Scopus
 
 
 
 
 
 América ante las puertas de la historia. The International Literary Quarterly #19, August 2013. Nueva York.
 
 Ciclovías: testimonio de la ausencia de un plan integral de transporte para Valdivia. REVISTA AUSTRAL DE CIENCIAS SOCIALES, 23: 133–140, 2012. ISI/Scopus.
 La mirada de Chile. Espacio Regional. Revista de Estudios Sociales, 1, Nº 7, 2010, págs. 39–45. Reimpreso con correcciones en Filósofos chilenos y el Bicentenario. Editorial Chancacazo, Santiago de Chile, 2012. ; y enThe International Literary Quarterly, #12, 2010).
 
 La idea de origen en el concepto de América. (versión corregida del articulo publicado en revista ARAUCARIA DE CHILE, Madrid 1990). En el libro Observaciones latinoamericanas. Ediciones Universidad Católica de Valparaíso. Libro seleccionado por el Fondo del Libro, convocatoria 2012. Editado por Sergio Caba y Gonzalo García. .
 
 
 La mirada de Chile. The International Literary Quarterly #12, August 2010. Nueva York 2010.
 
 
 
 
 
 
 
 Lope de Aguirre: elementos para la teoría del mito de la Conquista, Estudios Filológicos, Nº41/2006, Universidad Austral de Chile, Valdivia, pp. 145–163, ISI
 
 
 
 De Bergson a Sartre: creación y reproducción de la libertad, Revista de Filosofía de la Universidad de Costa Rica, volumen XLI, número 104, julio-diciembre 2003, pp. 85–96.
 Los límites de la propiedad privada según John Locke, Revista Cuadernos Salmantinos de Filosofía, Universidad de Salamanca, España, vol XXIX, 2002., pp. 69–82. Wos/Scopus
 
 Mestizaje y canibalismo, artículo en libro colectivo ARTE EN AMÉRICA LATINA Y CULTURA GLOBAL, editado por prof. Rebeca León (directora de posgrado Facultad Artes Universidad de Chile), Dolmen Ediciones, Santiago, 2002. pp. 139–150. English versión: A Cannibalistic Model of Posmodernity
 El medio ambiente en los derechos humanos de tercera generación. En libro colectivo CONSERVACION BIOLOGICA, PERSPECTIVA LATINOAMERICA; R. Primack, R. Rozzi, P. Feinsinger, R. Dirzo & F. Massardo; Ed. Fondo de Cultura Económica, Ciudad de México, México., pp. 338–340.
 
 Antígona o el debido entierro de los enemigos políticos: Revista GRIAL, Vigo, España, Nº 149, marzo 2001, Versión en castellano.
 
 Teoría de la ciudad sustentable; Revista TRANVIA (versión HTM), Departamento de Ingeniería de Transportes, Universidad de Chile, Santiago, # 11, 2001.
 Cultura nacional, globalição e antropofagia, en Luis Brandão et Antonieta Pereira (eds.), TROCAS CULTURAIS NA AMÉRICA LATINA, Universidad Fed. de Belo Horizonte, Minas Gerais, Brasil, 2000, pp. 195–206. Trad. al portugués por María Antonieta Pereira.
 
 La técnica, el ser humano y la naturaleza, Revista Cuadernos Salmantinos de Filosofía, Universidad de Salamanca, España, vol XXVII, 2000. Este artículo se encuentra en el libro La ciudad y las palabras
 Woody Allen, Lévi-Strauss y el incesto: Revista VERTENTES, # 12, 1999. Fondaçao de Ensino Superior de Sao Joao del Rei, Bello Horizonte, Brasil.
 
 
 
 El límite ético de las ciencias ambientales, Revista AMBIENTE Y DESARROLLO, vol. XIV, #3, 1998, Santiago, publicado por CIPMA
 
 La urbe como espacio infeliz, Cuadernos Salmantinos de Filosofía, Universidad de Salamanca, España vol. XXIV, pp 247.261.
 Nomadismo y despojo: notas sobre una propuesta de filosofía Americana; in FILOSOFÍA Y DEMOCRACIA, Cátedra Unesco-Chile, Ed. Lom, noviembre 1997, pp. 89–100
 Problemas de interpretación del debate indiano del siglo XVI; Revista PERSONA Y SOCIEDAD, vol 11, #3, Ilades, Santiago, diciembre 1997, pp. 41–50
 
 La figura del narrador en política: el caso del candidato Ricardo Lagos, REVISTA ESTUDIOS FILOLOGICOS Nº 31, 1996, Valdivia, Chile. I
 Bricolaje literario en filosofía y ciencias sociales, Revista ESTUDIOS FILOLOGICOS Nº 30, Universidad Austral de Chile, Valdivia ISI
 La colonización de lo imaginario, Sociedades indígenas y occidentalización en el México español. Siglos XVI-VIII, Recención bibliográfica en Revista GRIAL N° 120, diciembre 1993, Tomo XXXI, Vigo, España. Traducido al gallego.
 A difícil latinidade de América Latina; traducido del castellano al gallego, Revista GRIAL # 115, Julio-Sept 1992, tomo XXX, Vigo, España, Sept. 1992. (trad. del castellano)
 El primer americano: ¿Urzúa, Inés o Lope? Revista TALLER DE LETRAS, Facultad de Letras, N° Universidad Católica de Chile, Santiago, Chile.
 Conscience impersonnelle et machines désirantes. Quelques traits communs à Sartre et à Deleuze; numero especial del "Courrier de l'éducation nationale", (en la serie "Allegory old and new, creativity and continuity in culture", de la "Société Luxembourgeoise de littérature générale et comparée", Luxemburgo, Ducado de Luxemburgo, 1992
 
 
 Borges e o folclore inmortal, traducido al gallego, Revista GRIAL N° 112, Oct-Dec 1991, Tomo XXIX, Vigo, España
 
 Cervantes na UNESCO: ¿ e/ou a pluma?, traducido del castellano al gallego., Revista GRIAL N° 110, Abril-Xuño, 1991, Tomo XXIX, Vigo, España.
 La idea de origen en el concepto de América, Revista ARAUCARIA DE CHILE, #47-48, 1990, Madrid, España
 Apostar sin pruebas, génesis de la filosofía de Sartre. Revista ECHANGES N°4, Abril 1984, Instituto Chileno-Francés de Cultura, Santiago, Chile.

Journalism (not a complete list) 
 Agua: derechos sin derecho. Columna de opinión en diario Le monde diplomatique –  Santiago de Chile, abril 2019. p. 9.
 Providencia y sus zonas de sacrificio. Columna de opinión en diario electrónico El Mostrador, Santiago de Chile. 3/3/2019.
 Producir y obedecer. Buenas razones para eliminar la filosofía. Columna de opinión en diario La Tercera, Santiago de Chile, 31 de agosto 2016. Con motivo de la propuesta del Ministerio de Educación de eliminar la filosofía de la enseñanza secundaria chilena. 15
 No hay plan B. Columna de opinión en LE MONDE DIPLOMATIQUE, edición chilena, Nº 164, agosto 2015.
 Mundial, fútbol y carnaval. Artículo en LE MONDE DIPLOMATIQUE, edición chilena, Nº 153, julio 2014.
 La nación y la universidad. Columna en LE MONDE DIPLOMATIQUE, edición digital chilena, Nº 143, agosto 2013.
 Fotocopias subvencionadas vs. Bibliotecas buenas, artículo en EL CICERÓN AUSTRAL, publicación del Centro de Alumnos de la Facultad de Ciencias Jurídicas, Universidad Austral de Chile. 2005.
 La fierecilla domada, educación superior en Chile, artículo en revista Artes y Letras, diario El Mercurio, Santiago, 24/10/04
 El legado de Derrida, artículo en revista Artes y Letras, diario El Mercurio, Santiago, 17/10/04
 De Bergson a Sartre, artículo en revista Artes y letras, diario El Mercurio, Santiago, 6/04/03.
 Un juego de información, Revista Literastur Nº4, 2002 Gijón, España.
 El exilio y el mar; artículo en revista Artes y letras, diario El Mercurio, Santiago, 20/01/02.
 La tecnología no es neutra; artículo en revista Artes y Letras, diario El Mercurio, Santiago.
 El Idiota de la Familia: el Flaubert de Sartre; artículo en revista Artes y Letras, diario El Mercurio, Santiago, 27/02/00.
 Libertad de expresión, columna de opinión en p. A-2, diario El Mercurio, 26/06/99.
 La conquista de El Dorado, artículo en revista Artes y Letras, diario El Mercurio, 12/10/97.
 Reflexiones sobre Valdivia, columna de opinión en p A-2, diario El Mercurio, Stgo, 26/3/96.
 Los anhelos cumplidos, artículo en revista Artes y Letras, diario El Mercurio, 30/4/96.
 Artículos de crítica literaria en Diario La Nación, Santiago de Chile, 1994.
 Sartre, vivo, columna de opinión en diario El País (España), 15/4/89.
 Manuel Almeyda, artículo en revista ANALISIS, N° 76, Enero-Feb. 1984, Santiago, Chile.
 El hábito no hace al monje, artículo en revista ANALISIS, #48, agosto 1982. Santiago de Chile
 Artículos y editoriales en revista Perspectivas, Santiago, Chile. 1978-1983

Journalism in Revista Ecos de España y Lationoamérica 
 2020/01 Chile. El país avanza hacia una nueva constitución. Reportaje. pp. 40–42
 2019/9 La araña del rincón. Escenas de Ultramar. P. 15
 2018/12 La pesadilla de la comunicación. Escenas de Ultramar. P. 17
 2018/03 Piñera Presidente. Nuevo giro a la derecha. Reportaje. Pp. 28.29
 2018/02 Pailón. Escenas de Ultramar. P. 15
 2017/02 En bicicleta por Santiago de Chile. pp. 24–27
 2016/02 El desierto de Atacama. Tan seco y tan vivo. pp. 9–15. (HN: este texto fue publicado con a nombre de Hernán Neia, quien desconoce la autoría).
 2016/01 Un día en el mercado. Interculturalidad. pp. 56–59.
 2015/12 Una cena programada. Escenas de ultramar. P. 40
 2015/08 Chile. Vivir con los volcanes. Reportaje. pp. 48–51
 2015/02. El fin de la corbata. Escenas de ultramar, p. 52.
 2014/07 Arden 3.000 casas. Escenas de Ultranar. P. 58.
 2013/06 Mauricio, el maestro pintor. Sección: Un día en la vida de... pp. 30–31
 2013/05 Inflación de sonrisas. Escena de Ultramar. P. 34.
 2012/01 Escalando el volcán Villarrica. Lugares mágicos. Reportaje con fotos. Inserto. Pp. 1 a 8.
 2011/11 Protestas estudiantiles en Chile. Reportaje. pp. 38–41.
 2011/01 Viaje al fondo de la tierra. Reportaje. Pp. 42.45.
 2011/01 Soy un heredero. Escenas de ultramar. P. 52
 2010/05 Una nueva derecha en Chile. Reportaje. pp. 18–20.
 2010/04 El vecino del 77. Escenas de ultramar.
 2009/01 Entre internet y el machetazo. La vida de los jóvenes chilenos de hoy. Reportaje con fotos. pp. 48–52.
 2008/05 Una visita anhelada. Cuento. pp. 56–58.
 2002/03 Entrevista en sección 3x3. P. 7.
 2001/08 Curiosa caravana. Escena de Ultramar, p. 26.
 2000/10. Rupanco: el lago que siempre cambia. 9900 . pp. 52–55.
 2000/10 Quemar las naves. Escena de ultramar. P. 25.
 1999/12 Cazador cazado. Escena de Ultramar, p. 21.
 1999/05 Agua Fresca. Escena de Ultramar. P. 63.
 1999/01 Los mapuches. Reportaje. pp. 44–49.
 1998/05 Votos con uniforme. Escena de ultramar. Publicado como “El general”, mayo 1998, p. 27.
 1998/05 Una vista anhelada. Cuento.
 1998/04 Reportaje: Chiloé. El último refugio. pp. 60–64.
 1997/11 Un simple día de clases. Escena de ultramar, p. 53.
 1997/06 Reportaje: José León: Un artista en el ombligo del mundo, pp 66–68.
 1997/03 De profesión embaucador. Escena de ultramar, p. 23.
 1996/09 Un 18 de septiembre. Escena de ultramar, p 25.
 1995/05 Valdivia: la ciudad de los cisnes salvajes. Reportaje, pp. 52. 54.
 1994/07 Atacama, un desierto parecido al hielo. Reportaje, pp. 20–23.
 1994/03 Paseo presidencial Eduardo Frei. Reportaje, pp. 24–26.

References

1960 births
Living people
20th-century Chilean male writers
People from Lima
20th-century Chilean novelists
Chilean male novelists
Chilean philosophers
21st-century Chilean novelists
21st-century Chilean male writers